Seru or Sru Dayak is an extinct Austronesian language of Sarawak in Borneo. Smith (2017) classifies it as a Punan language.

References 

Languages of Malaysia
Punan languages
Extinct languages of Asia